Vítor Meira (born March 27, 1977) is a Brazilian auto racing driver. He formerly competed in the IndyCar Series and has twice finished second in the Indianapolis 500.

IndyCar Series

2002
After participating in an open test for Panther Racing at Texas Motor Speedway in 2002, Meira made his IndyCar debut with Team Menard on August 11, 2002 at Kentucky Speedway.  A little over a month later, Vitor won his first career pole at Texas Motor Speedway after just four starts, and finished in third place.

2003
In 2003, Meira ran his first start of the year for Team Menard at the Indianapolis 500, where he finished 12th as a rookie.  Meira then ran the next seven races in the #2 Johns Manville powered Dallara Chevrolet, until a practice crash at Kentucky Speedway sidelined him for the next three races.  After recovering from  his wrist injury he suffered at Kentucky, Vitor ran the final two races of the season.

2004
In 2004, Meira missed the first two races of the season before a race-by-race deal was presented to Meira by Rahal-Letterman Racing.  After Vitor's disappointing finish of 17th in Indy Japan 300, where he suffered a clutch problem, he ran the rest of the season in the #17 G-Force sponsored by Centrix Financial.  At The Milwaukee Mile, on July 25, 2004, Meira earned his second career pole.

2005
Rahal-Letterman Racing signed Meira to a three-year contract in 2005, with backing from longtime supporter, Johns Manville and Menards.  One notable race finish during the year was a second place to Dan Wheldon at the Indianapolis 500.  Meira gave Rahal-Letterman Racing their best final point standing finish of seventh as well as recording seven top five and eleven top ten finishes for the team.  After losing a majority of the funds for the #17 car, Rahal-Letterman needed a driver who had sponsorship with them.  For Meira, that meant losing his ride to Paul Dana, who brought Ethanol sponsorship.

2006
Going into 2006, Meira was looking to moving back to Brazil and run stock cars for fellow Brazilian and IndyCar competitor, Hélio Castroneves' team.  But just as he was getting ready to pack his bags for Brasília, he received a phone call from Panther Racing owner, John Barnes.  Even though Panther had lost their longtime sponsor, Pennzoil, as well as engine supplier, Chevrolet, the owners (John Barnes, Mike Griffin, Jim Harbaugh, and Doug Boles), sold off old cars, parts, and equipment to keep the team running.  After much speculation of the team closing its doors in Indianapolis, the news came on February 10, 2006 that Panther Racing and Meira signed a deal to run the famous #4 for the 2006 IndyCar season.  Throughout 2006, Panther Racing and Meira had a plethora of sponsors on the side of their Honda powered Dallara, including Econova, Network Live, Harrah's, Lincoln Tech, and Revive Energy Mints all adorned the sidepods of the brightly colored orange car during the 2006 season.  Despite not winning a race in 2006, Meira finished a career best of fifth in the IndyCar point standings after finishing the season with seven top five and twelve top ten finishes.  Even though he has not won a race in over 50 starts, he has finished second seven times in his career.

2007
After signing a three-year contract with Panther Racing in 2008, Meira was sponsored by longtime IndyCar participant, Delphi Corporation, who signed a two-year deal with the team.

Meira, who became engaged to longtime girlfriend, Adriana, in March 2006, was married at the Little White Wedding Chapel in Las Vegas on March 22, 2008.

2008
Meira returned to Panther Racing in 2008 where the United States National Guard became the car's primary sponsor and Delphi became a secondary one. However, the team again contracted to a single car in the IndyCar Series as the Aguri and their sponsorship took Mutoh to the IndyCar Series with Andretti Green Racing rather than Panther.

Meira finished second in the 2008 running of the Indianapolis 500 matching his second-place finish in 2005.  Meira chased the eventual winner, Scott Dixon, closing the gap to as little as 0.4 seconds until losing ground due to late race traffic.  Meira set his fastest lap on lap 195 of 200.

2009
Meira drove the #14 for A. J. Foyt Enterprises in 2009, replacing Darren Manning.  During the 2009 Indianapolis 500, Meira's car survived a spectacular fire in the pits and he later broke two vertebrae in his lower back during a crash involving Raphael Matos on lap 174. Meira did not need surgery and the fracture was treated with a back brace. Meira was out for the rest of the 2009 season.

2010
Meira drove to a podium finish in his first race back after his injury; a 3rd-place finish in his home country of Brazil. This would be his best finish of the year. Vitor drove to a 12th place overall finish in the points standings for the 2010 IndyCar Series season.

2011

Meira returned to A. J. Foyt Enterprises driving the #14 ABC Supply Company Indy Car.

Motorsports career results

Complete Euro Formula 3000 results
(key)

Complete IndyCar Series results
(key)

 1 Run on same day.
 2 Non-points-paying, exhibition race.

Indianapolis 500

Complete Stock Car Brasil results

† Ineligible for championship points.

References

External links

 Vitor Meira's Official Site
 IndyCar Driver Page

1977 births
Living people
Brazilian racing drivers
Stock Car Brasil drivers
Sportspeople from Brasília
British Formula Renault 2.0 drivers
A1 Team Brazil drivers
Indianapolis 500 drivers
IndyCar Series drivers
Brazilian IndyCar Series drivers
Auto GP drivers
Formula 3 Sudamericana drivers
Formula Ford drivers
American Le Mans Series drivers
Highcroft Racing drivers
Rahal Letterman Lanigan Racing drivers
Panther Racing drivers
A. J. Foyt Enterprises drivers
Vision Racing drivers
A1 Grand Prix drivers
Charouz Racing System drivers